Anchorage Press in London, was an international distributor of maritime training publications published by The North of England P&I Association. All titles were available in paperback format from maritime bookshops and online retailers. Amazon also supplied Kindle e-book versions.

Publications 
 
 The North of England P&I Association (2015). Rocks and Hard Places: How to Avoid Them. .
 Stephen Mills (2014). Bills of Lading: A Guide to Good Practice, Third Edition. .
 The North of England P&I Association (2013). Collisions: How to Avoid Them. .
 The North of England P&I Association (2012). An Introduction to P&I Insurance and Loss Prevention, Second Edition. .
 Arthur Sparks and The North of England P&I Association (2010). Steel Preshipment Surveys: A Guide to Good Practice, Second Edition. .
 Anthony Severn and The North of England P&I Association (2009). Shipboard Petroleum Surveys: A Guide to Good Practice, Second Edition. .
 Jim Dibble, Peter Mitchell and The North of England P&I Association (2009). Draught Surveys: A Guide to Good Practice, Second Edition. .
 Charles Bliault, Herman Kaps and The North of England P&I Association (2008). Deck Stowage and Securing of Pipes. .
 Charles Bliault and The North of England P&I Association (2007). Cargo Stowage and Securing: A Guide to Good Practice, Second Edition. .
 Stephen Mills and Ben Roberts (2006). Letters of Indemnity.  [Out of print, awaiting Second Edition].
 David Anderson, Daniel Sheard and The North of England P&I Association (2006). Cargo Ventilation: A Guide to Good Practice. .
 David Byrne and The North of England P&I Association (2005). Hatch Cover Maintenance and Operation: A Guide to Good Practice, Second Edition. .
 Richard Bracken (2003). Personal Injury Prevention: A Guide to Good Practice, Second Edition. .

References

External links
 The North of England P&I Association

Publishing companies of the United Kingdom